Rataul is a village located in the Khekra tehsil, in the Baghpat district, Uttar Pradesh state, India.

History
In colonial times, the local area judiciary court operated in Rataul. Many of its people were active in the Indian Freedom Movements, and some Rataulis took part in Khilafat Movement.

Agriculture
More than 200 varieties of mangoes have been grown in Rataul since about 1900 CE, and many are exported around the world. These have been awarded the "king of mangoes" international award many times.

References 

Villages in Bagpat district

https://www.census2011.co.in/data/village/119533-rataul-uttar-pradesh.html